The 2020–21 NBL season was the 40th season for the Adelaide 36ers in the NBL, and their first under new Head Coach Conner Henry.

Squad

Signings 

 The 36ers retained Jack McVeigh, Obi Kyei, Brendan Teys, Daniel Dillon and Alex Mudronja who had all signed multiple season contracts that covered the 2020–21 season.
 On 26 February 2020, former head coach Joey Wright and the club parted ways despite still have time left on his contract. Following his departure there were accusations of abuse and bullying by Wright across their final season together.
 On 12 March 2020, the 36ers announced that they had signed Josh Giddey on a Next Stars program contract.
 On 15 April 2020, club co-captain Kevin White was released from his remaining contract.
 On 6 May 2020, Daniel Johnson signed a new three-year deal with the club.
 On 16 July 2020, the 36ers signed 2018 NBL Rookie of the Year Isaac Humphries on a two-year deal.
 On 17 July 2020, the 36ers announced that Keanu Pinder had signed a one-year deal.
 On 22 July 2020, former Hawk Sunday Dech joined the 36ers on a three-year deal.
 On 18 August 2020, Jamie Pearlman was announced as the lead assistant coach.
 On 20 August 2020, Donald Sloan signed a one-year contract with the 36ers, filling their first import slot.
 On 29 September 2020, Obi Kyei's request to be released from his contract was granted by the 36ers, releasing him from the final year of his contract.
 On 1 December 2020, Tony Crocker signed a one-year deal to complete the 36ers roster.
 On 7 January 2021, the 36ers signed Owen Hulland as a development player for the 2020–21 season.
 On 7 February 2021, the 36ers granted Donald Sloan a release from the remainder of his contract.
 On 10 February 2021, Jeremy Kendle was announced as the temporary replacement of former import Sloan.
 On 18 February 2021, Brandon Paul was announced as the long-term replacement to Sloan.
 On 2 March 2021, the 36ers announced that Humphries was injured and would be sidelined for four to six weeks. Jack Purchase was announced as his injury replacement player.
 On 12 March 2021, Kendle was released from his short term contract.
 On 17 March 2021, Josh Giddey was released from the active playing roster to prepare for the 2021 NBA draft. He averaged 10.9 points, 7.3 rebounds and a league-leading 7.6 assists per game in 28 games played.

Roster

Pre-season 
To start their first season under their new head coach, the 36ers hosted 2 practice matches against the Brisbane Bullets.

Ladder

Game log 

|-style="background:#cfc;"
| 1
| 13 November
| Brisbane
| W 93–75
| Daniel Johnson (20)
| Josh Giddey (8)
| Josh Giddey (6)
| Adelaide Entertainment Centre4,516
| 1–0
|-style="background:#cfc;"
| 2
| 15 November
| Brisbane
| W 87–62
| Daniel Johnson (19)
| Isaac Humphries (12)
| Josh Giddey (7)
| Titanium Security Arena200
| 2–0

|-style="background:#fcc;"
| 3
| 9 January
| @ Cairns
| L 96–88
| Donald Sloan (24)
| Daniel Johnson (10)
| Daniel Dillon (3)
| Cairns Pop-Up Arena1,000
| 2–1

Regular season

Ladder

Game log 

|-style="background:#fcc;"
| 1
| 15 January
| Melbourne
| L 65–89
| Daniel Johnson (29)
| Dech, Giddey,  Johnson, Pinder (6)
| Josh Giddey (5)
| Adelaide Entertainment Centre6,539 
| 0–1
|-style="background:#cfc;"
| 2
| 17 January
| South East Melbourne
| W 116–108 (2OT)
| Daniel Johnson (33)
| Isaac Humphries (12)
| Josh Giddey (7)
| Adelaide Entertainment Centre6,518
| 1–1
|-style="background:#fcc;"
| 3
| 20 January
| South East Melbourne
| L 83–89
| Isaac Humphries (20)
| Daniel Johnson (10)
| Daniel Johnson (4)
| Adelaide Entertainment Centre6,946
| 1–2
|-style="background:#cfc;"
| 4
| 22 January
| New Zealand
| W 94–91 (OT)
| Isaac Humphries (24)
| Isaac Humphries (11)
| Daniel Johnson (4)
| Adelaide Entertainment Centre6,589
| 2–2
|-style="background:#cfc;"
| 5
| 27 January
| New Zealand
| W 88–78
| Isaac Humphries (21)
| Josh Giddey (10)
| Josh Giddey (8)
| Adelaide Entertainment Centre5,706
| 3–2
|-style="background:#cfc;"
| 6
| 30 January
| Sydney
| W 85–80
| Isaac Humphries (27)
| Isaac Humphries (9)
| Giddey, Johnson, Sloan (4)
| Adelaide Entertainment Centre7,087
| 4–2

|-style="background:#fcc;"
| 7
| 6 February
| Sydney
| L 75–94
| Daniel Johnson (21)
| Isaac Humphries (8)
| Josh Giddey (4)
| Adelaide Entertainment Centre7,317
| 4–3
|-style="background:#cfc;"
| 8
| 13 February
| @ Brisbane
| W 70–85
| Isaac Humphries (24)
| Isaac Humphries (13)
| Josh Giddey (7)
| Nissan Arena4,240
| 5–3
|-style="background:#fcc;"
| 9
| 15 February
| Brisbane
| L 74–93
| Daniel Johnson (20)
| Humphries, Johnson (8)
| Josh Giddey (8)
| Adelaide Entertainment Centre5,183
| 5–4

|-style="background:#fcc;"
| 10
| 21 February
| @ Sydney
| L 94–77
| Tony Crocker (15)
| Josh Giddey (7)
| Josh Giddey (7)
| John Cain Arena2,566
| 5–5
|-style="background:#cfc;"
| 11
| 23 February
| South East Melbourne
| W 99–94
| Daniel Johnson (27)
| Isaac Humphries (11)
| Josh Giddey (9)
| John Cain Arena1,079
| 6–5
|-style="background:#fcc;"
| 12
| 25 February
| Melbourne
| L 73–82
| Daniel Johnson (14)
| Giddey, Humphries, Johnson (8)
| Sunday Dech (4)
| John Cain Arena1,991
| 6–6
|-style="background:#fcc;"
| 13
| 27 February
| New Zealand
| L 62–106
| Jack McVeigh (20)
| Daniel Johnson (8)
| Daniel Johnson (4)
| John Cain Arena4,206
| 6–7
|-style="background:#fcc;"
| 14
| 4 March
| @ Illawarra
| L 98–89
| Tony Crocker (23)
| Daniel Johnson (8)
| Josh Giddey (9)
| State Basketball Centre1,355
| 6–8
|-style="background:#cfc;"
| 15
| 6 March
| Cairns
| W 81–71
| Daniel Johnson (30)
| Daniel Johnson (9)
| Josh Giddey (8)
| John Cain Arena3,708
| 7–8
|-style="background:#fcc;"
| 16
| 11 March
| @ Brisbane
| L 109–104
| Daniel Johnson (29)
| Daniel Johnson (9)
| Josh Giddey (11)
| John Cain Arena997
| 7–9
|-style="background:#fcc;"
| 17
| 14 March
| @ Perth
| L 97–88
| Brandon Paul (25)
| Josh Giddey (8)
| Josh Giddey (13)
| John Cain Arena4,019
| 7–10

|-style="background:#fcc;"
| 18
| 20 March
| @ South East Melbourne
| L 96–89 (OT)
| Brandon Paul (29)
| Josh Giddey (10)
| Josh Giddey (7)
| John Cain Arena1,682
| 7–11
|-style="background:#fcc;"
| 19
| 22 March
| @ Perth
| L 92–82
| Daniel Johnson (19)
| Daniel Johnson (8)
| Brandon Paul (5)
| RAC Arena9,550
| 7–12
|-style="background:#fcc;"
| 20
| 28 March
| @ Cairns
| L 79–65
| Daniel Johnson (21)
| Daniel Johnson (8)
| Sunday Dech (5)
| Cairns Pop-Up Arena1,945
| 7–13

|-style="background:#cfc;"
| 21
| 3 April
| Illawarra
| W 84–72
| Daniel Johnson (26)
| Daniel Johnson (15)
| Josh Giddey (8)
| Adelaide Entertainment Centre5,686
| 8–13
|-style="background:#cfc;"
| 22
| 10 April
| Perth
| W 83–68
| Daniel Johnson (28)
| Sunday Dech (10)
| Josh Giddey (12)
| Adelaide Entertainment Centre6,339
| 9–13
|-style="background:#fcc;"
| 23
| 14 April
| @ Cairns
| L 91–88
| Daniel Johnson (24)
| Josh Giddey (7)
| Josh Giddey (9)
| Cairns Pop-Up Arena1,869
| 9–14
|-style="background:#cfc;"
| 24
| 17 April
| @ South East Melbourne
| W 81–90
| Daniel Johnson (22)
| Daniel Johnson (8)
| Josh Giddey (9)
| John Cain Arena2,512
| 10–14
|-style="background:#fcc;"
| 25
| 24 April
| @ Melbourne
| L 92–78
| Brandon Paul (20)
| Josh Giddey (10)
| Josh Giddey (7)
| John Cain Arena3,034
| 10–15
|-style="background:#fcc;"
| 26
| 26 April
| @ New Zealand
| L 93–77
| Daniel Johnson (20)
| Josh Giddey (10)
| Josh Giddey (10)
| Silverdome893
| 10–16

|-style="background:#cfc;"
| 27
| 1 May
| Brisbane
| W 101–79
| Daniel Johnson (26)
| Josh Giddey (11)
| Josh Giddey (13)
| Adelaide Entertainment Centre6,683
| 11–16
|-style="background:#cfc;"
| 28
| 4 May
| Cairns
| W 92–76
| Brandon Paul (18)
| Johnson, Paul (10)
| Josh Giddey (6)
| Adelaide Entertainment Centre7,001
| 12–16
|-style="background:#cfc;"
| 29
| 9 May
| @ Sydney
| W 88–97 (OT)
| Daniel Johnson (20)
| Josh Giddey (10)
| Josh Giddey (12)
| Qudos Bank Arena4,063
| 13–16
|-style="background:#fcc;"
| 30
| 11 May
| @ Illawarra
| L 71–66
| Tony Crocker (16)
| Giddey, Pinder (9)
| Josh Giddey (8)
| WIN Entertainment Centre2,036
| 13–17
|-style="background:#fcc;"
| 31
| 16 May
| @ Sydney
| L 85–75
| Daniel Johnson (23)
| Giddey, Johnson, Pinder 7
| Josh Giddey (5)
| Qudos Bank Arena5,078
| 13–18
|-style="background:#fcc;"
| 32
| 21 May
| Illawarra
| L 73–81
| Daniel Dillon (17)
| Daniel Dillon (8)
| Daniel Dillon (5)
| Adelaide Entertainment Centre6,090
| 13–19
|-style="background:#fcc;"
| 33
| 23 May
| Perth
| L 68–76
| Daniel Johnson (13)
| Brandon Paul (11)
| Crocker, Dillon (5)
| Adelaide Entertainment Centre6,422
| 13–20
|-style="background:#fcc;"
| 34
| 25 May
| @ New Zealand
| L 94–76
| Daniel Dillon (22)
| Paul, Pinder (7)
| Daniel Dillon (6)
| Christchurch Arena2,803
| 13–21
|-style="background:#fcc;"
| 35
| 30 May
| @ Illawarra
| L 97–83
| Sunday Dech (15)
| Keanu Pinder (11)
| Daniel Dillon (6)
| WIN Entertainment Centre3,004
| 13–22

|-style="background:#fcc;"
| 36
| 6 June
| @ Melbourne
| L 102–80
| Tony Crocker (27)
| Daniel Johnson (13)
| Daniel Dillon (6)
| Adelaide Entertainment Centre1,817
| 13–23

Awards

Player of the Week 
Round 2, Isaac Humphries

Round 9, Josh Giddey

See also 
 2020–21 NBL season
 Adelaide 36ers

References

External links 

 Official Website

Adelaide 36ers
Adelaide 36ers seasons
clubname season